During the 1996–97 season Valencia CF competed in La Liga, Copa del Rey and UEFA Cup.

Summary
During summer the club transferred in several players such as 1994 FIFA World Cup Winner Romário on loan from FC Barcelona, Forward Claudio López, centre back Defender Fernando Cáceres, Brazilian midfielder Leandro Machado and Croatian Striker Goran Vlaović from Padova Calcio in an attempt to replace the sale of Predrag Mijatović to Real Madrid. The purchase of Romário was controversial after several disputes between the Brazilian star and Luis Aragonés upon October when the forward finished his agreement and left the club to return to Flamengo. On 19 November 1996 after a bad streak of results and controversies with President, Luis Aragonés renounces as coach. Then, the club appointed  Jorge Valdano as its new manager for the rest of the season.

In League, the team collapsed to the 10th spot getting out of the Continental competitions next year. Also, in Copa del Rey the squad was eliminated in Eightfinals by underdogs Segunda División team UD Las Palmas after two legs and a penalties series. Finally, the club was defeated by Schalke 04 in UEFA Cup Quarterfinals stage with a 1–3  score.

Squad
Squad at end of season

Transfers 

Source: BDFutbol.com

Competitions

La Liga

League table

Position by round

Matches

Source: Competitive Matches

Copa del Rey

First round

UEFA Cup

Round of 64

Round of 32

Eightfinals

Quarterfinals

Statistics

Players statistics

See also
Valencia CF
1996–97 La Liga
1996–97 Copa del Rey

References
 La Liga Primera División 95–96 RSSSF.com

Valencia CF seasons
Spanish football clubs 1996–97 season